Timothy Tuttle "Tim" Brown (July 24, 1938 – September 14, 1989) was an American former figure skater.  He won the silver medal at the U.S. Figure Skating Championships four times and twice captured the silver at the World Figure Skating Championships.  He also competed at the 1960 Winter Olympics.  In 1961, he earned another berth to the World Championships but did not make the trip due to illness, a move that was fortunate for him, as the entire U.S. Figure Skating team was killed en route to the competition when Sabena Flight 548 crashed near Brussels.

Brown also competed in ice dance, winning the bronze at the 1958 nationals with partner Susan Sebo.  He died of AIDS in 1989.

Results

Men's singles

Ice dancing
(with Sebo)

References

1938 births
1989 deaths
AIDS-related deaths in California
American male single skaters
American male ice dancers
Olympic figure skaters of the United States
Figure skaters at the 1960 Winter Olympics
World Figure Skating Championships medalists